Broadgate is a large,  office and retail estate in the Bishopsgate Without area of the City of London. It is owned by British Land and GIC and managed by Savills. 

The estate is in part of the eastern City fringe, outside the line of the now lost defensive walls, and east of the former Moorfields; a part of the city that is often described as part of the East End of London.

The original developer was Rosehaugh: it was built by a Bovis / Tarmac Construction joint venture and was the largest office development in London until the arrival of Canary Wharf in the early 1990s.  The original scheme was designed by Arup Associates, Team 2, which was headed by Peter Foggo, who later left Arup to set up his own practice Peter Foggo Associates, where he completed the initial phase of works.  

Broadgate Circle is a civic space at the heart of the Broadgate Estate. The Circle was part of the original design by Arup Associates and was redesigned by the group in 2015. The key colonnade structure, formed of 54 travertine columns, was maintained and the retail spaces and amphitheatre were modernised and made more accessible. Throughout the year the space is used for a wide range of activities.

Location

The modern and mainly-pedestrianised development is located on the original site of Broad Street station (closed in 1986) and beside and above the railway approaches into Liverpool Street station.

The perimeter of the managed estate is Bishopsgate to the east, Sun Street, Appold Street and the eastern part of Worship Street to the north, the southern part of Wilson Street to the west and Eldon Street and Liverpool Street to the south. Included in the estate are Broadgate Circle and Exchange Square. 

Boundary changes which came into effect in 1994 now place the entire estate within the Bishopsgate Without area of the City of London - previously a part was in the Shoreditch area of the London Borough of Hackney. It now lies wholly within the ward of Bishopsgate.

Ownership
Several different companies such as British Rail have participated in the development of the estate. Between 2003 and 2009 the whole estate was owned by British Land, which has been involved since 1984. In October 2009, British Land sold a 50% share of the estate to the Blackstone Group. In 2014, GIC agreed to acquire the 50% interest in Broadgate owned by the Blackstone Group.

Buildings

This building stands over the railway tracks out of Liverpool Street station.

Broadgate Estates manage other major office and retail developments in London such as Paternoster Square, home of the London Stock Exchange.

In early 2011 there was controversy over the redevelopment of the site of a Peter Foggo building, when it was suggested by the City of London's Chief Planning Officer Peter Rees and Ken Shuttleworth that Peter Foggo would have been pleased that the building would be demolished.

The headquarters of Swiss bank UBS are situated at 5 Broadgate, a steel-clad groundscraper designed by Ken Shuttleworth of Make Architects.

Events
On 7 August 2010, Broadgate became host to the twice-monthly Broadgate Farmers' Market.

In the winter months Broadgate Circle used to host Broadgate Ice; London's only turn up and skate ice rink. In November 2017, Broadgate installed their first Christmas market.

Arts Programme
In 2012, Broadgate announced the Broadgate Art Trail which would showcase 16 artworks over a 32-acre plot.

References

External links

Official website
201 Bishopsgate and the Broadgate Tower

Buildings and structures in the City of London
Districts of the City of London
Redevelopment projects in London
Privately owned public spaces
British Land